Pedro of Brazil  may refer to:

 Pedro I of Brazil (1798–1834), founder and first ruler of the Empire of Brazil
 Pedro II of Brazil (1825–1891), second and last ruler of the Empire of Brazil
 Pedro, Prince Imperial of Brazil (1848–1850), fourth and last child of the Emperor Pedro II of Brazil and Teresa Cristina of the Two Sicilies